Ancylandrena rozeni is a species of mining bee in the family Andrenidae. It is found in Central America and North America.

References

Further reading

 
 

Andreninae
Articles created by Qbugbot
Insects described in 1994